Dipraglurant (INN) (code name ADX-48621) is a negative allosteric modulator of the mGlu5 receptor which is under development by Addex Therapeutics for the treatment of Parkinson's disease levodopa-induced dyskinesia (PD-LID). As of 2014, it is in phase II clinical trials for this indication. Addex Therapeutics is also investigating an extended-release formulation of dipraglurant for the treatment of non-parkinsonian dystonia.

See also
 Basimglurant
 Fenobam
 Mavoglurant
 Raseglurant

References

External links
 Dipraglurant-IR for Parkinson's disease levodopa-induced dyskinesia - Addex Therapeutics
 Dipraglurant-ER for dystonia - Addex Therapeutics

Imidazopyridines
MGlu5 receptor antagonists
Organofluorides
Alkyne derivatives